Volleyball at the 2010 Asian Games was held in Guangzhou, Guangdong, China from November 13 to 27, 2010. In this tournament, 18 teams played  in the men's competition, and 11 teams participated in the women's competition. All matches were played at the Guangwai Gymnasium, the Guangyao Gymnasium and the Zhongda Gymnasium.

Schedule

Medalists

Medal table

Draw
The draw ceremony for the team sports was held on 7 October 2010 at Guangzhou.

Men
The teams were distributed according to their position at the 2006 Asian Games using the serpentine system for their distribution.

Group A
  (Host)
  (9)
 
 

Group B
  (1)
  (7)
 
 

Group C
  (3)
  (6)
 
 
 

Group D
  (4)
  (5)
 
  Athletes from Kuwait

Women
The teams were distributed according to their position at the 2006 Asian Games using the serpentine system for their distribution.

Group A
  (Host)
  (4)
  (5)
 
 

Group B
  (2)
  (3)
  (6)

Final standing

Men

Women

References

External links
 Asian Volleyball Confederation

 
2010 Asian Games events
Asian Games
2010
2010 Asian Games